UTC+10:30 is an identifier for a time offset from UTC of +10:30. This time is used in parts of Australia.

As standard time (Southern Hemisphere winter)

Oceania
Australia
New South Wales
Lord Howe Island

As daylight saving time (Southern Hemisphere summer)
Principal cities: Adelaide, Broken Hill

Oceania
Australia – Central Daylight Time (ACDT)
New South Wales
Broken Hill
South Australia

See also
Time in Australia

References

UTC offsets
Time in Australia